Dobson Hall is the name shared by residence and academic buildings at several colleges and universities.

Home to the Division of Fine Arts at MidAmerica Nazarene University in Olathe, Kansas, USA
A campus services building at Northeastern Oklahoma A&M College in Miami, Oklahoma, USA
A residence at State University of New York at Brockport in Brockport, New York, USA
A residence at Truman State University in Kirksville, Missouri, USA
A residence at University of Wisconsin-Platteville in Platteville, Wisconsin, USA

Architectural disambiguation pages